Haplogroup T is a human mitochondrial DNA (mtDNA) haplogroup. It is believed to have originated around 25,100 years ago in the Near East.

Origins
Mitochondrial clade T derives from the haplogroup JT, which also gave rise to the mtDNA haplogroup J. The T maternal clade is thought to have emanated from the Near East .

Distribution

The basal haplogroup T* is found among Algerians in Oran (1.67%) and Reguibate Sahrawi (0.93%). It is also distributed among the Soqotri (1.2%).

Haplogroup T is present at low frequencies throughout Western and Central Asia and Europe, with varying degrees of prevalence and certainly might have been present in other groups from the surrounding areas. T is found in approximately 10% of native Europeans. It is also common among modern day Iranians. Based on a sample of over 400 modern day Iranians , the T haplogroup represents roughly 8.3% of the population (about 1 out of 12 individuals), with the more specific T1 subtype constituting roughly half of those. Furthermore, the specific subtype T1 tends to be found further east and is common in Central Asian and modern Turkic populations , who inhabit much of the same territory as the ancient Saka, Sarmatian, Andronovo, and other putative Iranian peoples of the 2nd and 1st millennia BC. Lalueza-Fox et al. (2004) also found several T and T1 sequences in ancient burials, including Kurgans, in the Kazakh steppe between the 14th-10th centuries BC, as well as later into the 1st millennia BC. These coincide with the latter part of the Andronovo period and the Saka period in the region.

The geographic distribution within subclade T2 varies greatly with the ratio of subhaplogroup T2e to T2b reported to vary 40-fold across examined populations from a low in Britain and Ireland, to a high in Saudi Arabia . Within subhaplogroup T2e, a very rare motif is identified among Sephardic Jews of Turkey and Bulgaria and suspected conversos from the New World .

Found in Svan population from Caucasus (Georgia) T* 10,4% and T1 4,2%. T1a1a1 is particularly common in countries with high levels of Y-haplogroup R1a, such as Central and Northeast Europe. The clade is also found everywhere in Central Asia and deep into North Asia, as far east as Mongolia.

T2c and T2d appear to have a Near Eastern origin around the time of the Last Glacial Maximum (LGM) and more recent dispersals into Europe. Most of T2c comprises haplogroup T2c1. Apart from a peak in Cyprus, T2c1 is most common in the Persian Gulf region but is also found in the Levant and in Mediterranean Europe, with a more far-flung distribution at very low levels.

T2 is also found among the Soqotri (7.7%).

Archaeology
Wilde et al. (2014) tested mtDNA samples from the Yamna culture, the presumed homeland of Proto-Indo-European speakers. They found T2a1b in the Middle Volga region and Bulgaria, and T1a both in central Ukraine and the Middle Volga. The frequency of T1a and T2 in Yamna samples were each 14.5%, a percentage higher than in any country today and only found in similarly high frequencies among the Udmurts of the Volga-Ural region.

Haplogroup T has also been found among Iberomaurusian specimens dating from the Epipaleolithic at the Afalou prehistoric site in Algeria. One ancient individual carried the T2b subclade (1/9; 11%). Additionally, haplogroup T has been observed among ancient Egyptian mummies excavated at the Abusir el-Meleq archaeological site in Middle Egypt, which date from the Pre-Ptolemaic/late New Kingdom (T1, T2), Ptolemaic (T1, T2), and Roman (undifferentiated T, T1) periods. Fossils excavated at the Late Neolithic site of Kelif el Boroud in Morocco, which have been dated to around 3,000 BCE, have also been observed to carry the T2 subclade. Additionally, haplogroup T has been observed in ancient Guanche fossils excavated in Gran Canaria and Tenerife on the Canary Islands, which have been radiocarbon-dated to between the 7th and 11th centuries CE. The clade-bearing individuals were inhumed at the Tenerife site, with one specimen found to belong to the T2c1d2 subclade (1/7; 14%).

Africa
In Africa, haplogroup T is primarily found among Afro-Asiatic-speaking populations, including the basal T* clade. Some non-basal T clades are also commonly found among the Niger-Congo-speaking Serer due to diffusion from the Maghreb, likely with the spread of Islam.

Asia

Europe

Subclades

Tree
This phylogenetic tree of haplogroup I subclades is based on the paper  and subsequent published research . For brevity, only the first three levels of subclades (branches) are shown.
T
T1
T1a
T1a1
T1a2
T1b
T2
T2a
T2a1
T2b
T2b1
T2b2
T2b3
T2b4
T2b5
T2b6
T2c
T2c1
T2d
T2e
T2e2
T2f
T2f1
T2g

Health issues
One study has shown Haplogroup T to be associated with increased risk for coronary artery disease . However, some studies have also shown that people of Haplogroup T are less prone to diabetes ( and ).

A few tentative medical studies have demonstrated that Haplogroup T may offer some resistance to both Parkinson's disease and Alzheimer's disease.

One study has found that among the Spanish population, hypertrophic cardiomyopathy (HCM) also referred to as hypertrophic obstructive cardiomyopathy (HOCM) is more likely to happen in those of T2 ancestry than those in other maternal haplogroups. It is unknown whether or not this is specific to this subclaude of haplogroup T or is a risk factor shared by all of haplogroup T. With a statistically significant difference found in such a small sample, it may be advisable for those of known haplogroup T maternal ancestry to be aware of this and have their physician check for evidence of this condition when having a routine exam at an early age. It is usually symptom-less and increases the risk of sudden cardiac death, which often happens to those of as early in life as teenagers and may affect those who are active and have no other risk factors.

Certain medical studies had shown mitochondrial Haplogroup T to be associated with reduced sperm motility in males, although these results have been challenged . According to the Departamento de Bioquimica y Biologica Molecular y Celular, Universidad de Zaragoza, Haplogroup T can predispose to asthenozoospermia . However, these findings have been disputed due to a small sample size in the study .

Famous members

During the BBC One documentary Meet the Izzards, the actor and comedian Eddie Izzard learns that her mitochondrial DNA is of Haplogroup T, specifically the subclade T2f1a1.

Nicholas II of Russia
The last Russian Tsar, Nicholas II, has been shown to be of Haplogroup T, specifically subclade T2 . Assuming all relevant pedigrees are correct, this includes all female-line descendants of his female line ancestor Barbara of Celje (1390–1451), wife of Sigismund, Holy Roman Emperor. This includes a great number of European nobles, including George I of Great Britain and Frederick William I of Prussia (through the Electress Sophia of Hanover), Charles I of England, George III of the United Kingdom, George V of the United Kingdom, Charles X Gustav of Sweden, Gustavus Adolphus of Sweden, Maurice of Nassau, Prince of Orange, Olav V of Norway, and George I of Greece.

See also

Genetics

Backbone mtDNA Tree

References

Footnotes

Citations

Websites

Further reading

External links
General
Ian Logan's Mitochondrial DNA Site
Mannis van Oven's Phylotree
The Genographic Project Public Participation Mitochondrial DNA Database
Haplogroup T
Discussion List at RootsWeb
Spread of Haplogroup T, from National Geographic
Genetic Genealogy: A Personal Perspective on Tara, Karelians and Kent, England
Analysis of a Haplogroup T sequence (T5/T2)
Phylogenetic Networks for the Human mtDNA Haplogroup T 
mtDNA Haplogroup T - Full Genomic Sequence Research Project
Phylogenetic Networks for the Human mtDNA Haplogroup T 

T